Actress is a 2007 Russian comedy film directed by Stanislav Govorukhin.

Plot
The story revolves around Anna who is a young divorced women. She is a theater actress, who's unsatisfied with the minor roles offered to her. Loneliness surrounds her life. One day Anna meets an interesting man with who she falls in love. She is soon forced to choose between her career and love, when she's offered a lead role.

Cast
Yevgenia Dobrovolskaya as Аnnа
Yuri Stepanov as Vikenty
Mariya Aronova as neighbor 
Dmitry Pevtsov as  neighbor
Alexander Abdulov as Bosyakin
Fyodor Bondarchuk as film director
Mikhail Yefremov as Gusyatnikov
 Svetlana Nemolyaeva as theater actress
 Irina Skobtseva as Varvara Fominichna, Vikenty's mother
 Kira Golovko as Iraida Eduardovna

References

External links
  
 

2007 films
Russian romantic comedy films
2000s Russian-language films
2007 romantic comedy films
Films directed by Stanislav Govorukhin